Cedar Villa Estates is a hamlet in the Canadian province of Saskatchewan, located southwest of Saskatoon.

Demographics 

References

Corman Park No. 344, Saskatchewan
Designated places in Saskatchewan
Organized hamlets in Saskatchewan